Pioneer Florida Museum and Village is an open-air museum in Dade City, Florida in Pasco County. The museum complex includes Overstreet House, a one-room schoolhouse, a church, a train depot, a train engine, and a museum exhibition of tools, household items, antiques and farm equipment.

References

External links
Pioneer Florida Museum and Village website

Dade City, Florida
Museums in Pasco County, Florida
Open-air museums in Florida